Otto Kähler (3 March 1894 – 2 November 1967) was a German admiral during World War II. He was a recipient of the Knight's Cross of the Iron Cross with Oak Leaves. Kähler relinquished command of Thor on 20 July 1941 to Günther Gumprich.

He was appointed the commander of the naval forces in Brittany in September 1944. He was captured by US forces soon thereafter. Repatriated February 1947, he died in Kiel on 2 November 1967.

Awards
 Iron Cross (1914) 2nd Class (1 October 1915)
 U-boat War Badge (1918)
 Clasp to the Iron Cross (1939) 2nd Class & 1st Class
 Knight's Cross of the Iron Cross with Oak Leaves
 Knight's Cross on 22 December 1940 as Kapitän zur See and commander of auxiliary cruiser Thor (HSK 4)
 583rd Oak Leaves on 15 September 1944 as Konteradmiral and sea-commander of the fortress Brest

References
Citations

Bibliography

 
 
 

1894 births
1967 deaths
Counter admirals of the Kriegsmarine
German prisoners of war in World War II held by the United States
Imperial German Navy personnel of World War I
Military personnel from Hamburg
Recipients of the Knight's Cross of the Iron Cross with Oak Leaves
Reichsmarine personnel